Robert Scott Lovett (June 22, 1860 – June 19, 1932) was an American lawyer and railroad executive. He was president and chairman of the board of the Union Pacific Railroad and a Director of both The National City Bank of New York and Western Union.

Biography

Early life
Robert Scott Lovett was born in San Jacinto, Texas. He was the son of William Lovett and Susan Hardy Lovett. His mother died in 1861 when Robert was only one year old; he was raised by Sarah Elizabeth "Sally" Hood Lovett, his father's second wife. He attended Houston High School. Lovett studied law privately and was admitted to the bar in 1882.

Career
Lovett served as counsel for the Houston East & West Texas Railroad from 1884 to 1889. He then served as council for the Texas the Pacific from 1891 to 1903.

From 1904 to 1909 Robert S. Lovett was general counsel, and after 1909 president, of the E. H. Harriman system of railroads—the Union Pacific and Southern Pacific.  In the wake of the Northern Securities Case he was compelled to dissolve the Southern Pacific and Union Pacific merger in 1913.  In 1914 he accepted directorships in the New York Central and Nickel Plate railroads. Consequently, the Lovett family settled into a "Gold Coast" mansion at Locust Valley, New York. During World War I he filled important positions in the management of railroads, and was chosen president (1919) and chairman of the Board of Directors (1920) of the Union Pacific System.

Personal life
In 1890, Lovett married Lavinia Chilton Abercrombie, daughter of lawyer and Texas state senator Leonard A. Abercrombie, granddaughter of Justice William Parish Chilton. His wife died in 1928. Their only child was noted politician Robert A. Lovett.

Lovett died on July 19, 1932, at the Medical Center in Washington, D.C.

Legacy

See also
 List of railroad executives

References 

 Bryant, Keith L., Jr., Editor. Encyclopedia of American Business History and Biography, Railroads in the Twentieth Century. New York: Facts on File, 1990.
 Frey, Robert L., Editor. Encyclopedia of American Business History and Biography, Railroads in the Nineteenth Century. New York: Facts on File, 1988.
 Klein, Maury. The Life and Legend of E.H. Harriman. Chapel Hill [N.C.]: University of North Carolina Press, 2000.

External links
 

1860 births
1932 deaths
People from Walker County, Texas
American lawyers
20th-century American railroad executives
Union Pacific Railroad people
Southern Pacific Railroad